The Independent Printing House CDN (better known as CDN) was an underground printing house (bibuła) operating in Poland between 1982 and 1990.

Formed after the imposition of the Martial Law in Poland, it focused on publishing various mostly history-related books. Apart from the modern history of Poland and Central Europe, the topics included also other topics banned by the Communist censorship, including sociology and politology. The CDN also published a number of magazines and music tapes, among them a series of cassettes featuring the songs of Jan Krzysztof Kelus.

See also
 List of record labels

Polish record labels
Record labels established in 1982
Record labels disestablished in 1990
Publishing companies of Poland
1982 establishments in Poland